A Conspiracy of Kings is a young adult fantasy novel by Megan Whalen Turner, published by the Greenwillow Books imprint of HarperCollins in 2010. It is the fourth novel in the Queen's Thief series that Turner inaugurated with The Thief in 1996.

The first five chapters were released on the HarperCollins Children's Books site for previewing purposes.

The trade paper edition of August 2011 appends to the novel an original Queen's Thief short story, "Destruction", and several nonfiction items.

Setting 
The books are set in a Byzantine-like imaginary landscape, reminiscent of ancient Greece and other territories around the Mediterranean. The action takes place in the countries of Eddis, Attolia, and Sounis. The characters' names are Greek, and references are made to actual Greek authors, but this is fantasy, not historical fiction. The gods of Turner's pantheon, ruled by the Great Goddess Hephestia, are her own, and her world possesses such items as guns and pocket watches.

Plot 
Sophos, the Magus's once studious young protégé, finds himself out of his element as his family is ambushed in their villa in Sounis. Sophos at first succeeds in evading capture and hiding his mother and sisters, but is betrayed by the servants. Mistakenly sold into slavery, he finds himself content with manual labor and forms a camaraderie with the other slaves. However, when faced with a choice between a life of contentment or influence, he chooses the latter.

After a harrowing escape from the Baron who owned him, Sophos inherits the throne of Sounis. Not only is his country deadlocked in war with Attolia, it is also torn by a civil war. With neither the monetary resources nor manpower to secure his throne, Sophos is faced with several options, each with heavy consequences. Aided by the Magus, he turns to his old friend Eugenides, the former Thief of Eddis, with whom Sophos traveled years before and who is now the King of Attolia.

Queen's Thief series 

 1996 The Thief
 2000 The Queen of Attolia
 2006 The King of Attolia
 2010 A Conspiracy of Kings
 2017 Thick as Thieves
 2020 Return of the Thief

References

External links 

Megan Whalen Turner (official)
Sounis fan discussion of the series at LiveJournal
 

2010 American novels
Young adult fantasy novels
American fantasy novels
American young adult novels
2010 fantasy novels
Greenwillow Books books